Bagnica refers to the following places in Poland:

 Bagnica, Pomeranian Voivodeship
 Bagnica, West Pomeranian Voivodeship